The women's balance beam competition for gymnastics artistic at the 2019 Southeast Asian Games in Philippines was held from 2 to 4 December 2019 at Rizal Memorial Coliseum.

Schedule
All times are Philippine Standard Time (UTC+8).

Results

Qualification

Final

References

Women's balance beam